Bassussarry is a commune in the Pyrénées-Atlantiques department in the Nouvelle-Aquitaine region of southwestern France.

The inhabitants of the commune are known as Basusartars.

Geography
Bassussary is located in the former province of Labourd and within the urban area of Bayonne some 5 km south-east of Biarritz and 4 km south by south-west of Bayonne. Access to the commune is by the D932 road from Anglet in the north which passes through the commune on the eastern side and continues south to Ustaritz. The town is in the west of the commune and can be accessed by the D254 road which branches from the D932 on the northern border of the commune and continues through the town west to join the D810 south-west of Biarritz Airport. The D3 comes from the A63 autoroute Exit  (Bayonne-Sud) to the town then south forming the western border of the commune and continuing to Arcangues. South-east of the town is another urban area of Betbeder. Much of the commune is urbanised with some areas of forest and meadows. The eastern part next to the D932 contains an industrial estate.

Two bus services pass through and have stops in the commune operated by Transports 64:
Service 860 Bayonne to Cambo-les-Bains
Service 880 Bayonne to Arbonne

The commune lies in the drainage basin of the Adour with the Nive river forming the whole eastern border of the commune as it flows north to join the Adour. The Ruisseau d'Urdains flows from a small lake just south of the commune northwards, forming the north-eastern border of the commune, before joining the Nive in the north-eastern corner. The Ruisseau de Harrieta flows from the south-west of the commune to the north-east joining the Ruisseau d'Urbaine near the D932. The Ruisseau de Pétaboure rises in the north-west of the commune and forms the northern border as it flows east to join the Ruisseau de Harrieta in the commune.

Places and Hamlets 

 Axerimendi
 Behikenea
 Betbeder
 Borda Nasa
 Bordaberria
 Castanche
 Dorriotz
 Harrieta
 Juanita
 Juantipi
 Larrebure
 Lataste
 Luberri
 Martinaskoenea
 Moussans
 Oihenart
 Peillé
 Penen
 Portukoborda
 Urdains (château)
 la Vigne
 Xemeto

Toponymy
The commune name in Basque is Basusarri. Jean-Baptiste Orpustan proposed a structure of baso meaning "forest" and sarri meaning "dense" or "tight" giving the overall meaning of "dense forest".

The following table details the origins of the commune name and other names in the commune.

Sources:

Raymond: Topographic Dictionary of the Department of Basses-Pyrenees, 1863, on the page numbers indicated in the table. 
Orpustan: Jean-Baptiste Orpustan,   New Basque Toponymy
Ldh/EHESS/Cassini: 
Lhande: Pierre Lhande, Basque-French Dictionary, 1926 
Register: Church Register of Bayonne

Origins:
Bayonne: Cartulary of Bayonne or Livre d'Or (Book of Gold)
Collations: Collations of the Diocese of Bayonne
Navarre: Titles of the Kingdom of Navarre

Bassussarry appears as Baßußarry on the 1750 Cassini Map and does not appear at all on the 1790 version.

History

During the Peninsular War on 10 December 1813 Bassussarry was the scene of a battle between General Suchet and the Spanish-English.

Heraldry

Administration

List of Successive Mayors

Intercommunality

Bassussarry is one of nine inter-communal structures:

the Communauté d'agglomération du Pays Basque;
the SIVOM of Arbonne-Arcangues-Bassussarry;
the energy association of Pyrénées-Atlantiques;
the inter-communal association for the management of the Txakurrak centre;
the inter-communal association to support Basque culture;
the joint association for the management of drinking water Ura;
the joint association for collective and non-collective sanitation Ura
the joint association of maritime Nive;
the joint association of the drainage basin of the Nive.

Bassussarry is the seat of the SIVOM Arbonne-Arcangues-Bassussarry
 
The commune is part of the Bayonne-San Sebastián Eurocity.

Demography
In 2017 the commune had 3,126 inhabitants.

Education
The commune has a public primary school.

Economy
The commune is in the Appellation d'origine contrôlée (AOC) zone of Ossau-iraty

Culture and heritage

Religious heritage
The Parish Church of Saint-Barthélemy (19th century) is registered as an historical monument.

Language
According to the Map of the Seven Basque Provinces by Louis Lucien Bonaparte the Basque spoken in Bassussarry is Northern Upper Navarrese dialect.

Notable people linked to the commune
 Dominique Joseph Garat, born in 1749 at Bayonne and died in 1833 at Bassussarry, was a lawyer, journalist, and French philosopher. He was elected to the Académie française in 1803.
 Christophe-Louis Légasse, born in 1859 at Bassussarry and died in 1931 at Périgueux, was a French Catholic Prelate, successively Apostolic prefect in Saint Pierre and Miquelon from 1899 to 1915, Bishop of Oran from 1915 to 1920, and Bishop of Périgueux from 1920 to 1931.
 Christophe Hondelatte, journalist born in 1962 at Bayonne, grew up in Bassussarry.

See also
Communes of the Pyrénées-Atlantiques department

References

External links

Communes of Pyrénées-Atlantiques